Health information exchange (HIE) is the mobilization of health care information electronically across organizations within a region, community or hospital system. Participants in data exchange are called in the aggregate Health Information Networks (HIN). In practice, the term HIE may also refer to the health information organization (HIO) that facilitates the exchange.

HIE provides the capability to electronically move clinical information among different health care information systems. The goal of HIE is to facilitate access to and retrieval of clinical data to provide safer and more timely, efficient, effective, and equitable patient-centered care which may also be useful to public health authorities in analyses of the health of the population.

HIE systems facilitate the efforts of physicians and clinicians to meet high standards of patient care through electronic participation in a patient's continuity of care with multiple providers. Secondary health care provider benefits include reduced expenses associated with:
 the manual printing, scanning and faxing of documents, including paper and ink costs, as well as the maintenance of associated office machinery
 the physical mailing of patient charts and records, and phone communication to verify delivery of traditional communications, referrals, and test results
 the time and effort involved in recovering missing patient information, including any duplicate tests required to recover such information

According to an internal study at Sushoo Health Information Exchange, the current method of exchanging patients' health information accounts for approximately $ of expenses annually for a single-clinician practice.

Formal organizations are now emerging to provide both form and function for health information exchange efforts, both on independent and governmental or regional levels. These organizations are, in many cases, enabled and supported financially by statewide health information exchange grants from the Office of the National Coordinator for Health Information Technology. These grants were legislated into the HITECH components of the American Recovery and Reinvestment Act of 2009. The latter organizations (often called Regional Health Information Organizations, or RHIOs) are ordinarily geographically defined entities which develop and manage a set of contractual conventions and terms, arrange for the means of electronic exchange of information, and develop and maintain HIE standards.

In the United States, federal and state regulations regarding HIEs and HIT (health information technology) are still being defined. Federal regulations and incentive programs such as "Meaningful Use", which is formally known as the EHR Incentive Program, are rapidly changing the face of this relatively new industry. In addition to changes driven by federal activities. The lessons learned in the ongoing implementation of some state-sponsored HIEs (such as the North Carolina HIE) and the fluctuating nature of health care regulations at the level of the state governments themselves are leading to additional refinement. However, HIEs and RHIOs continue to struggle to achieve self-sustainability and the vast majority remain tied to federal, state, or independent grant funding in order to remain operational. Some exceptions exist, such as the Indiana HIE.

Storage and gathering of information

Data architecture models
There are two main models for the data architecture of health information exchanges. One is a federated, or decentralized model, and the second is a centralized one. There is also a hybrid model that contains elements of both. In a centralized HIE, there is a central (or master) database that holds a complete copy of all of the records of every patient contained in the HIE. In a federated HIE, there is no master database.

In a federated model, each healthcare provider is responsible for maintaining the records of their individual patients. In this model, the main function of the HIE is to facilitate the exchange of patient records among providers as the need arises. Each federated HIE may accomplish this in a slightly different way, but the salient distinction is that in a federated model there is no central database from which a previously compiled comprehensive medical record is stored and can be downloaded.

In short, in a federated HIE, records are exchanged electronically among providers when they need them. In a centralized model, all patient information is uploaded to a single database from which any provider in the HIE can download a patient's full medical record.

Patient consent 
Exchanges in the US must operate with patient consent to comply with not only the Health Insurance Portability and Accountability Act (HIPAA), but also a variety of state and federal laws and regulations. This was clarified by the Office of Civil Rights in the January 2013 Final Omnibus Rule Update to HIPAA.

There are two methods for gaining patient consent. One is explicit consent and is termed opt-in. With this method, a patient is not automatically enrolled into the HIE by default and generally must submit a written request to join the exchange.

The other method is implicit patient consent and is termed opt-out. In this method patients give implicit consent to join an HIE when they agree to use the services of a health care provider who is submitting data into an HIE and sign the provider's Notice Of Privacy Practices. In this model patients can request to opt out of the HIE, generally with a written form.

List of European health information exchanges

The Netherlands 
Frysian Health Information Exchange
Connects Medical Centre Leeuwarden and Academic Center in Groningen with community hospitals like Nij Smellinghe Hospital in Drachten.
The Friesland Regional Cardiology Network speeds up the referral process, improves both diagnosis and the clinical decision process. On average, it reduces the length-of-stay for patients in hospitals by one or two days. From their office workstations, cardiologists are able to consult the advanced clinical images provided by any hospital linked to the network. The distributed storage of records eliminates the duplication of records across multiple sites. Once uploaded to the cardiology network, records remain available for consultation at any time so that previous episodes of a patient's care can be consulted in detail no matter where the care was provided in the region.

North of the Netherlands – XDS Network 
Hospitals in the Dutch provinces Groningen, Friesland and Drenthe have created an (diagnostic) image exchange network in order to phase out CD/DVD based exchanges using an IHE (XDS) platform. St. Gerrit, the local HIE organization, has gradually expanded the network since 2014, spanning 10 hospitals to date. Diagnostic images and related reports are exchanged to support a number of use-cases including radiology referrals to the Academic Medical Center Groningen (UMCG), radiotherapy treatments, CVA Stroke Traumas and proton therapy. The HIE network has developed a number of cross-enterprise workflows using IHE XDW.

Other Dutch HIEs 
 ZorgNetOost
 Radboud University Medical Center
 Jeroen Bosch Ziekenhuis
 Limburg Exchange Network – Maastricht University Medical Center, Maastro Radiation Therapy Institute, Laurentius Hospital
 Image Exchange South East-Brabant – Maxima Medical Center, Elkerliek Hospital, Catharina Hospital Eindhoven, St. Anna Hospital
 Regional Exchange Network West-Brabant
 Image Exchange Network Breda – Amphia Hospital, BVI, Elisabeth-TweeSteden Hospital
 Rotterdam Exchange Network RijnmondNet
 TRIJN
 Zorgring Noord-Holland Noord

United Kingdom 
 Sussex and Surrey
 Bristol
 Great Ormond Street Hospital

Ireland 
 NIMIS

Finland 
 Helsinki-Uusimaa Health district

List of United States health information exchanges

Individual exchanges

Chesapeake Regional Information System for our Patients
 CRISP is a non-profit corporation that is implementing health information exchange in the state of Maryland.  The organization also serves as the Health IT Extension Center for Maryland.  CRISP was created by Johns Hopkins Medicine, MedStar Health, the University of Maryland Medical System and Erickson Retirement Communities. Audacious Inquiry, a health information system consulting firm, serves as the technical architect and strategic partner for the health information exchange while Dynamed Solutions provides operational, project management and organizational support under CRISP.

Health Current, formerly Arizona Health-e Connection (AzHeC)
Health Current, formerly Arizona Health-e Connection (AzHeC), is the health information exchange (HIE) that helps partners transform care by bringing together communities and information across Arizona. Health Current grew out of a gubernatorial executive order in 2007 and a subsequent collaborative community effort to develop a statewide health information technology (health IT) strategic plan or roadmap.

CORHIO - the Colorado Regional Health Information Organization 
 CORHIO is one of the United States' largest public health information exchange networks and the state designated entity for HIE in Colorado.  As of November 1, 2014, 38 Colorado hospitals and more than 2,200 doctors, and 130 long-term and post-acute care centers were connected to the CORHIO HIE.

Delaware Health Information Network
 DHIN is a non-profit public-private partnership enacted by the Delaware General Assembly in 1997, for the benefit of all citizens of Delaware to advance the creation of a statewide health information network and to address Delaware's needs for timely, reliable and relevant health care information.  DHIN has adopted regulations to govern its operations and has policies and procedures in place to support privacy and security of patient information.  DHIN enhances a health care information exchange started in May 2007. In February 2012, The Delaware Health Information Network announced full participation of all acute care hospitals and skilled nursing facilities in the state, along with the vast majority of Delaware providers, in the first statewide community health record. As of June 2013, DHIN has attracted the participation of 97 percent of Delaware providers, tracks nearly 88 percent of Delaware's population, and delivers more than 10 million clinical results and reports to participating providers annually.

Great Lakes Health Connect
 Great Lakes Health Connect (GLHC), based in Grand Rapids, is the largest provider of Health Information Exchange (HIE) services in Michigan. GLHC was founded in 2009 as Michigan Health Connect (MHC) when several health systems in West Michigan (including Spectrum Health, Trinity Health, Metro Health, Lakeland Health, and Northern Michigan Regional Health System) agreed to collaborate and not compete on clinical data exchange. In March of 2010 MHC was formally launched as a charitable [509(a)2] non-profit corporation in Michigan. In June of 2014 Michigan Health Connect merged with Great Lakes Health Information Exchange (GLHIE) to form Great Lakes Health Connect.

HealthShare Exchange of Southeastern PA
 HSX is a unique, membership-dues-supported nonprofit formed by the Delaware Valley's hospitals/health systems and healthcare insurers.  It makes electronic patient-care information available securely throughout the area's medical system, linking data across hospital systems and healthcare insurers as a service to HSX members and participants.

Idaho Health Data Exchange
The Idaho Health Data Exchange (IHDE) is the state designated Health Information Exchange (HIE) for Idaho.  Health Information Exchange enables doctors, nurses, labs, and other medical providers to securely access their patient's electronic health information quickly, 24/7/365, to improve the speed, quality, safety, and cost of patient care. IHDE is a non-profit 501(c)(6) company. The IHDE is Idaho created, based, and managed. Located in Boise, ID, the staff consists of an Executive Director, Executive Assistant, Sr. Marketing Coordinator, Business Analysts (Implementations), Training/Support Specialists, and IT systems support. The IHDE's mission is to create, and maintain a collaborative effort to improve the coordination and quality of healthcare through the use of Health Information Exchange and Health Information Technology. The IHDE is governed by a voluntary Board of Directors and voluntary Privacy and Security Committee which provides oversight of compliance and best practices. Members of the Board of Directors and Privacy and Security Committee represent the private and public sectors, and health care delivery systems.

Indiana Health Information Exchange
 The Indiana Health Information Exchange (IHIE) operates the U.S.'s largest HIE and one of the oldest with data on more than 7 million patients, connecting hospitals, rehabilitation centers, long term care facilities, laboratories, imaging centers, clinics, community health centers and other healthcare organizations.  Created by the Regenstrief Institute, a medical informatics think tank, the Indiana Network for Patient Care (INPC) is a secure network that provides patient records to participating doctors. The IHIE provides current data about admissions, discharges, and transfers to help health plans and accountable care organizations reduce non-urgent emergency department visits. This HIE grew over time from 12 hospitals in the center of the state with approximately 5,000 physicians, to 106 hospitals out of 126 in the state and more than 14,000 physicians in Indiana.

Kansas Health Information Network
Kansas Health Information Network is a private health information network in Kansas created to allow connected physicians, healthcare facilities and other healthcare providers to share patient information. Participants will have access to powerful analytic reports designed to help improve patient encounters and clinical outcomes while also empowering physicians as they transition to the new alternative payment models involving quality reporting, advancing care information, clinical practice improvements and resource use. KaMMCO Health Solutions (KHS) have partnered to offer the aforementioned products and services across the state.

Keystone Health Information Exchange
KeyHIE was founded by Geisinger Health System in April 2005, via a memorandum of understanding signed by 8 hospitals throughout Central Pennsylvania.  One of the nation's largest and most advanced health information exchanges, KeyHIE connects 18 hospitals, 251 physician practices, 95 long-term care facilities, 30 home health agencies and other healthcare organizations such as EMS agencies, pharmacies, and federally qualified health centers (FQHCs).  It serves 4.3 million patients over a 53-county presence in Pennsylvania to ensure health information follows patients, regardless of where they receive care. KeyHIE offers a wide range of services to doctor's offices, hospitals, nursing homes and other healthcare organizations in Pennsylvania and surrounding areas.

 Michiana Health Information Network (MHIN)
 MHIN began in 1998 as a secure central data repository of personal health histories and as a safe and efficient method to share that information with doctors, nurses, rehab facilities, and other caregivers. Today, MHIN serves as a regional Health Information Exchange (HIE), serving northern Indiana and southern Michigan and holds 17 years of clinical exchange data making it one of the oldest functioning HIEs in the country. It operates as a community-based nonprofit organization focused on improving health outcomes for the community under a population health strategy. Major community investors include Beacon Health System, Saint Joseph Health System, The Medical Foundation, and all clinical partners. Strategic initiatives focus on improving the health of the service community by leveraging HIE data to reduce chronic disease, infant mortality, diabetes, and to improve access to quality care for integrated and behavioral health. MHIN offers various healthcare I.T. solutions to 3,000+ healthcare providers including: Electronic Health Records management software, Care Coordination software, Health I.T. Consulting, Population Health Data and Analytics, and Health Information Exchange. It is one of only seven HIEs in the country that is nationally recognized and accredited by EHNAC for excellence in ensuring the privacy, security, and accuracy of data collected.

Missouri Health Connection
 Missouri Health Connection(MHC) is a nonprofit organization that operates Missouri's statewide health information network. Established in 2009, MHC's mission is to enable Missouri healthcare providers-from small, rural clinics to large hospital systems-to securely share a patient's medical data. With our wide network of hospitals, clinics, and community health centers, MHC's network will connect inpatient and outpatient care in Missouri.  MHC's network covers two-thirds of the inpatient care in Missouri and enables physicians to access more complete patient records.

 Ohio Health Information Partnership — CliniSync HIE
 The Ohio Health Information Partnership is a nonprofit, public/private partnership initially funded with $14.8 million in federal HITECH funds under the Office of the National Coordinator for HIT. It is the state-designated statewide health information exchange founded by the Ohio State Medical Association, the Ohio Osteopathic Association, the Ohio Hospital Association, BioOhio and the Ohio Department of Insurance.  CliniSync is an independent nonprofit founded in 2009. It received $43.8 million in HITECH funding.
 Federal funds paid for the creation of the technological infrastructure, powered by Medicity, as well as discounted implementation fees for hospitals in Ohio.  CliniSync has 148 hospitals contracted, with 123 "live," and over 400 long-term and post-acute care facilities downloading care summaries for their patients.
 The CliniSync HIE continues to grow each day, with more and more physicians connecting. In 2015, CliniSync enabled practices and other authorized users to look up and find (query and retrieve) a longitudinal Community Health Record on a patient that gives clinician a full picture of a patient's health, including recent visits to various hospitals hospital, allergies, tests and reports, care summaries and other useful information. Patients in Ohio automatically are enrolled in the CliniSync HIE unless they wish to opt out.
 Along with results and reports delivery and the Community Health Record, CliniSync members will receive notifications when a patient is discharged or admitted to the hospital or Emergency Department in late 2016. The CliniSync base has extended to 400 plus long-term and post-acute care facilities, behavioral health facilities, and even to social service agencies whose patients need the resources of the community beyond medical care. The nonprofit is now fiscally independent of any federal funds.

Pennsylvania eHealth Partnership Authority
 Taking over the work of the PA eHealth Collaborative, the Pennsylvania eHealth Partnership Authority (PAeHealth) provides leadership and strategic direction for public and private, federally funded and state-funded investments in health information technology initiatives, including health information exchange capabilities and other related health information technology efforts. The Authority's direction has considered the stakeholder community's needs and will complement commonwealth agency operations. It also will ensure ongoing inter-agency cooperation.

Utah Health Information Network
 The Utah Health Information Network (UHIN) is a broad-based coalition of Utah healthcare insurers, providers, and other interested parties, including the Utah State government. Since 1993, UHIN members have come together for the common goal of reducing healthcare costs and improving the quality of care through the use of electronic data interchange (EDI) for healthcare transactions. Exchanging information electronically rather than by phone, fax or surface mail means that data can get to those who need it securely, economically and efficiently. UHIN currently serves nearly all the hospitals, ambulatory surgery centers, national laboratories, insurers, and approximately 90% of the medical providers in Utah as well as the Utah State government. As a community organization, the focus is on creating data exchange solutions that work for the entire healthcare community, from large integrated networks to single-provider offices. The Clinical Health Information Exchange (cHIE) is a secure electronic way for medical professionals to share and view patient information that is needed at the point of care.  The cHIE makes this information accessible, with patient consent, to authorized users while maintaining the highest standards of patient privacy.

See also
 DICOM (Digital Imaging and Communications in Medicine)
 LOINC (Logical Observation Identifiers Names and Codes)
 Health informatics
 Health Level 7 (HL7)
 Integrating the Healthcare Enterprise (IHE)
 Medical imaging
 Regional Health Information Organization (RHIO)

References

Sources

 
 
 

Health informatics